Night Sports is the fifth studio album by American duo 3OH!3. The album is their first album released under Fueled By Ramen, where the band signed in February 2016. The album was released on May 13, 2016.

Singles
The first single released from the album was "My Dick", which was surprise released on December 4, 2015. The music video for the single was premiered on the same day, and it was directed by Tony Yacenda. "Mad at You" was released on March 4, 2016 to iTunes, alongside the pre-order for the album. The music video, directed by Isaac Ravishankara, was released the same day. On March 17, 3OH!3 announced a remix contest for the song where the winner would have their remix reposted on Fueled by Ramen's SoundCloud account, shared on the band's Facebook and Twitter accounts, as well as it being uploaded to the band's YouTube channel. The contest ended on April 20, with Wagner Koop being announced as the winner.

"BASMF" was released as single on March 18, 2016. The music video was released the same day. "Hear Me Now", which was released on April 15, 2016. The music video for the song was released on May 12, 2016. The fifth and final single for the album was "Freak Your Mind", which was released on May 6, 2016.

Track listing
All songs produced by 3OH!3.

Charts

References

3OH!3 albums
2016 albums
Photo Finish Records albums
Atlantic Records albums